Phyllonorycter populialbae is a moth of the family Gracillariidae. It is known from the Caucasus.

The larvae feed on Populus alba. They probably mine the leaves of their host plant.

References

populialbae
Moths of Europe
Moths of Asia
Moths described in 1961